Ivan Alekseyevich Dyagolchenko (born 2 November 1980) is a former Russian professional footballer.

Club career
He made his Russian Football National League debut for FC Zvezda Irkutsk on 28 March 2007 in a game against FC Mashuk-KMV Pyatigorsk.

External links
 

1980 births
Living people
Russian footballers
Russian expatriate footballers
Expatriate footballers in Kazakhstan
Expatriate footballers in Tajikistan
Russian expatriate sportspeople in Tajikistan
FC SKA Rostov-on-Don players
Russian expatriate sportspeople in Kazakhstan
FC Sokol Saratov players
FC Arsenal Tula players
FC Taganrog players
FC Zvezda Irkutsk players
Association football defenders
FC Dynamo Saint Petersburg players
Tajikistan Higher League players